Enriquez is a Spanish patronymic surname meaning "son of Enrique" and a common surname in Spain and Latin America.

Notable people with the surname Enriquez include:
Alberto Enríquez Gallo (1895–1962), president of Ecuador 1937–1938
Antonio Enríquez Gómez (1601–1661), Spanish dramatist, poet and novelist of Portuguese origin
Baltasar de la Cueva Enríquez (1626–1686), Spanish viceroy of Peru 1674–1678
Blanca Enriquez, American educator
Bobby Enriquez (1943–1996), Filipino Jazz pianist 
Camilo Ponce Enríquez (politician) (1912–1976), president of Ecuador 1956–1960
Carlos Enríquez Gómez (1900–1957), Cuban painter, illustrator and writer of the Vanguardia movement
Enrico Enriquez (1701–1756), Italian cardinal
Francisco Fernández de la Cueva Enríquez, 10th Duke of Alburquerque (1655–1733), Spanish viceroy of New Spain 1702–1711
Jocelyn Enriquez (born 1974), Filipina dance singer
José Perches Enríquez (1882–1939), Mexican musician and composer
Joy Enriquez (born 1979), American singer and actress
Juan Enriquez, founding director of the Life Sciences Project at Harvard Business School
Juana Enríquez (1425–1468), Queen of Aragon, second wife of John II of Aragon
Kataluna Enriquez (born 1993/1994), American beauty pageant contestant
Luis Enríquez Bacalov (born 1933), Argentine film score composer
Luis Enríquez de Guzmán, conde de Alba de Liste (born c. 1605), viceroy of New Spain and Peru 1650–1661
Manuel Curros Enríquez (1851–1908), Galician writer and journalist
Marco Enríquez-Ominami, Chilean filmmaker and politician
Martín Enríquez de Almanza (died 1583), Spanish viceroy of New Spain 1568–1580; viceroy of Peru 1581–1583
Michel Enríquez (born 1979), Cuban baseball player
Miguel Henríquez (c. 1680–1743), Puerto Rican pirate and privateer
Miguel Enríquez Espinosa (1944–1974), Chilean revolutionary leftist leader during the Allende and Pinochet regimes
Mike Enriquez (born 1951), Filipino radio and television newscaster
Payo Enríquez de Rivera (1622–1684), Spanish Augustinian friar, viceroy of New Spain 1673–1680
René Enríquez (1933–1990), American television actor
Silvia Hernández Enríquez (born 1948), Mexican politician, government minister 1994–1997

References

Spanish-language surnames
Patronymic surnames
Surnames from given names